Charles the Deaf from the House of Bjelbo (Folkungaätten) was the jarl of Sweden during 1216–1220.

Biography
His father was magnate Bengt Snivil. He was the brother of Magnus Minnesköld and jarl Birger Brosa and father of jarl Ulf Fase. Charles died at the Battle of Lihula in Estonia August 8, 1220.

The seal of Charles, discovered in the early 1990s, is dated to the end of the 12th century and thus the oldest preserved personal object in Swedish history.  Personal seals were normally broken to pieces at the death of the owner in order to prevent later abuse, and the intact seal of Charles is therefore unique.  The Swedish Museum of National Antiquities bought it in 2001 for SEK 800,000.

References

Other sources
 
 
 

1220 deaths
Swedish military personnel killed in action
Swedish politicians
13th-century Swedish people
Year of birth unknown
Swedish jarls